A complex victim is someone who, although they were victimized, does not fit the requirement of being an "ideal victim" because they are morally compromised in some respect or partially responsible for their own victimization.

References

Victimology